Scrobipalpa alterna is a moth in the family Gelechiidae. It was described by Mark I. Falkovitsh and Oleksiy V. Bidzilya in 2006. It is found in the southern Ural mountains and south-eastern Kazakhstan.

The larvae feed on Krascheninnikovia ceratoides.

References

Scrobipalpa
Moths described in 2006